"It's You" is a song and single written by Larry Butler, performed by the comedian Freddie Starr and released in 1974.

English comedian, Freddie Starr, who died in 2019 had two hit singles in the UK during his lifetime. "It's You" was the first and biggest hit making number 9 in the UK Singles Charts in 1974 staying in the charts for 10 weeks.

References 

1974 songs
1974 singles
Songs written by Larry Butler (producer)
1970s ballads
Country ballads